Las Colonias may refer to:
Las Colonias, Texas, a former census-designated place in Zavala County, Texas
Las Colonias Department, in Santa Fe Province, Argentina